This is a list of newspapers in South Korea.

National papers

Top 10 Comprehensive Daily newspapers 
Chosun Ilbo (daily) 1,212,208
Dong-A Ilbo (daily) 925,919
JoongAng Ilbo (daily) 	861,984
Hankook Ilbo (daily) 219,672
Hankyoreh (daily) 205,748
Munhwa Ilbo (daily) 195,068
Kyunghyang Shinmun (daily) 190,677
Seoul Shinmun (daily) 160,348
Segye Ilbo (daily) 93,669
Kookmin Ilbo (daily) 74,685

English language
Korea Economic Daily (Seoul, national, English)
Korea JoongAng Daily (Seoul, national, English)
The Korea Herald (Seoul, national, English)
The Korea Times (Seoul, national, English)
Indigo (Busan, international, English)

Others
Aju Business Daily (Seoul, national)
Busan Ilbo (Busan, regional)
Chungcheong Daily (Cheongju, regional)
Daegu Shinmun (Daegu, local)
Daejeon Ilbo (Daejeon, regional)
Dongyang Ilbo (Cheongju, regional)
Electronics Daily (Seoul, national)
Financial News (Seoul, national)
Gangwon Ilbo (Chuncheon, regional)
Gangwon Shinmun (Wonju, regional)
Good Day (Seoul, national)
Gyeongnam Domin Ilbo (Gyeongnam, regional)
Halla Ilbo (Jeju, regional)
Hankook Gyeongje (Seoul, national)
Herald Economy (Seoul, national)
Ilgan Sports (Seoul, national)
Jeju Ilbo (Jeju, regional)
Kookje Shinmun (Busan, regional)
Kyosu Shinmun
Maeil Gyeongje (Seoul, national)
Money Today (Seoul, national)
NewsPim
Seoul Gyeongje (Seoul, national)
Sports Chosun (Seoul, national)
Sports Seoul (Seoul, national)
Sports Today (Seoul, national)
Stock Daily (Seoul, national)

Defunct
This section may include titles published prior to the 1948 division of Korea.
 Hanseong sunbo, 1883-1884

See also
Lists of newspapers in Korea
 
List of newspapers
Ministry of Culture and Tourism
Korea Newspaper Circulation Service

External links
Korea Newspaper Circulation Service
Korean Commission of Press Korean-only website
Korea Association of Newspapers
Korea On-line Newspaper Association
Korean Newspapers List WorldNewsList
Korean Specified Newspaper Association
 MediaSIS; Media Statistics Information System

South Korea
 
Newspapers
Newspapers